The 106th Virginia General Assembly was the meeting of the legislative branch of the Virginia state government from 1901 to 1904, after the 1901 state elections. It convened in Richmond for four sessions.

Background

Senate

Members

Changes in membership

Senate
November 4, 1902, Carter Glass (D-20th district) resigned. He was succeeded by Don P. Halsey.
March 12, 1903, George W. LeCato (D-37th district) died. He was succeeded by Ben T. Gunter.

See also
 List of Virginia state legislatures

References

Government of Virginia
Virginia legislative sessions
1901 in Virginia
1902 in Virginia
1903 in Virginia
1904 in Virginia
1901 U.S. legislative sessions
1902 U.S. legislative sessions
1903 U.S. legislative sessions
1904 U.S. legislative sessions